The École des troupes aéroportées (ETAP), or School of Airborne Troops, is a military school  dedicated to training the military paratroopers of the French army. It was established in 1964 and is located in the town of Pau, in the département of Pyrénées-Atlantiques, France.

It is a training unit of the French Army, under the French Army Training Command (COFAT). The only parachute regiment that is not trained here is the 2nd Foreign Parachute Regiment, which trains at 
Camp Raffalli in the Promo Parachutiste.

History
The ETAP has its origins at the end of the Second World War with the establishment of the Airborne Troops Training Center (CETAP) on April 16, 1946. On 1 June 1947 the CETAP became the ETAP.
As of 7 October 2014, 899 American soldiers have graduated the ETAP.

Mission
The ETAP is responsible for training paratroopers, officer and enlisted. It is also responsible for international cooperation and promotion of paratroop culture. It also serves as a center for the development of paratroop doctrine and training.

Composition
The ETAP is divided into three components: a command center, a training centre, and a support center.

Training courses
 Training for certification as military Parachuting (2 weeks) 
 Officer and NCO training (7 days to 4 weeks) 
 Training for paratrooper monitors, free drop monitors, and pilotes parachutes biplaces (8 weeks) 
 Training for Chuteurs Opérationnels (12 weeks) 
 Training for air-delivery
 Training in drop techniques
 Military training to other countries within the framework of cooperation

Units which train at ETAP
 8th Marine Infantry Parachute Regiment: 8e Régiment Parachutiste d'Infanterie de Marine (8e RPIMa)

References

External links
 Official website

Military parachuting in France
Military parachuting schools
Airborne Troops
Airborne Troops